Eve Arden (born Eunice Mary Quedens, April 30, 1908 – November 12, 1990) was an American film, radio, stage and television actress. She performed in leading and supporting roles for nearly six decades.

Beginning her film career in 1929 and on Broadway in the early 1930s, Arden's first major role was in the RKO Radio Pictures drama Stage Door (1937) opposite Katharine Hepburn, followed by roles in the comedies Having Wonderful Time (1938) and the Marx Brothers' At the Circus (1939). She received an Academy Award nomination for Best Supporting Actress for her role in Mildred Pierce (1945).

Somewhat surprisingly for an actress of Arden's refinement and wit, she appeared to good effect in a number of films noir, some exceptionally high-profile, including Mildred Pierce, The Unfaithful (1947), The Arnelo Affair (1947), Whiplash (1948), and Anatomy of a Murder (1959).

Later in her career, Arden moved to television, playing a sardonic but engaging high school teacher in Our Miss Brooks, for which she won the first Primetime Emmy Award for Outstanding Lead Actress in a Drama Series. She also played the school principal in the film musicals Grease (1978) and Grease 2 (1982).

Early life
Eve Arden was born Eunice Mary Quedens on April 30, 1908, in Mill Valley, California, to Charles Peter Quedens, the son of Charles Henry Augustus Quedens and Eunice Meta Dierks; and Lucille Frank, the daughter of Bernard Frank and Louisa Mertens. Lucille, a milliner, divorced Charles over his gambling and went into business for herself.

Although not Catholic, young Eunice was sent to a Dominican convent school in San Rafael, California. She then attended Tamalpais High School, a public high school in Mill Valley, until age 16. After leaving school, she joined the stock theater company of Henry "Terry" Duffy.

Career

Film
She made her film debut under her real name in the backstage musical Song of Love (1929), as a wisecracking, homewrecking showgirl who becomes a rival to the film's star, singer Belle Baker. The film was one of Columbia Pictures' earliest successes. In 1933, she relocated to New York City, where she had supporting parts in multiple Broadway stage productions. In 1934, she was cast in the Ziegfeld Follies revue, the first role where she was credited as Eve Arden. When she was told to adopt a stage name for the show, Arden looked at her cosmetics and "stole my first name from Evening in Paris, and the second from Elizabeth Arden". Between 1934 and 1941, she appeared in Broadway productions of Parade, Very Warm for May, Two for the Show, and Let's Face It!.

Arden's film career began in earnest in 1937 when she signed a contract with RKO Radio Pictures and appeared in the films Oh Doctor and Stage Door. Her Stage Door portrayal of a fast-talking, witty supporting character gained Arden considerable notice and was a template for many of Arden's future roles.

In 1938, she played a supporting part in the comedy Having Wonderful Time, starring Ginger Rogers and Douglas Fairbanks, Jr.. This was followed by roles in the crime film The Forgotten Woman (1939), and the Marx Brothers comedy At the Circus (1939), a role that required her to perform acrobatics.

In 1940, she appeared in support of Clark Gable and Hedy Lamarr in Comrade X, followed by support in the drama Manpower (1941) opposite Marlene Dietrich, Edward G. Robinson and George Raft. She also had a supporting part in the Red Skelton comedy Whistling in the Dark (1941) and the romantic comedy Obliging Young Lady (1942).

Her many memorable screen roles include a supporting role as Joan Crawford's wise-cracking friend in Mildred Pierce (1945), for which she received an Academy Award nomination as Best Supporting Actress; as a catty cousin turned peacemaker in The Unfaithful (1947); and as James Stewart's wistful but wry secretary in Otto Preminger's mystery Anatomy of a Murder (1959) (which also featured her husband, Brooks West). In 1946, exhibitors voted her the sixth-most promising "star of tomorrow".

Arden became familiar to a new generation of filmgoers when she played Principal McGee in Grease (1978) and Grease 2 (1982). Arden was known for her deadpan comedic delivery.

Radio and television

Arden's ability with witty scripts made her a natural talent for radio. She was a regular on Danny Kaye's short-lived but memorably zany comedy-variety show in 1946, which also featured swing bandleader Harry James and gravel-voiced character actor-comedian Lionel Stander.

The additional exposure of Arden's comic talent on Kaye's show led to her best-known role, that of Madison High School English teacher Connie Brooks in Our Miss Brooks. Arden portrayed the character on radio from 1948 to 1957, in a television version of the program from 1952 to 1956, and in a 1956 feature film. Her character clashed with the school's principal, Osgood Conklin (played by Gale Gordon) and nursed an unrequited crush on fellow teacher Philip Boynton (played originally by future film star Jeff Chandler; and later on radio and TV by Robert Rockwell). Except for Chandler, the entire radio cast of Arden, Gordon, Richard Crenna (Walter Denton), Robert Rockwell (Mr. Philip Boynton), Gloria McMillan (Harriet Conklin) and Jane Morgan (landlady Margaret Davis) played the same roles on TV.

Arden's portrayal of Miss Brooks was so popular that she was made an honorary member of the National Education Association, received a 1952 award from the Teachers College of Connecticut's Alumni Association "for humanizing the American teacher", and even received teaching job offers. Her well-established wisecracking, deadpan character ultimately became her public persona as a comedienne.

She won a listeners' poll by Radio Mirror magazine as the top-ranking comedienne of 1948–1949, receiving her award at the end of an Our Miss Brooks broadcast that March. "I'm certainly going to try in the coming months to merit the honor you've bestowed upon me, because I understand that if I win this (award) two years in a row, I get to keep Mr. Boynton," she joked. She was also a hit with the critics: A winter 1949 poll of newspaper and magazine radio editors by Motion Picture Daily named her the year's best radio comedienne.

Arden had a very brief guest appearance in a 1955 I Love Lucy episode titled "L.A. at Last", where she played herself. While awaiting their food at the Brown Derby, Lucy Ricardo (Lucille Ball) and Ethel Mertz (Vivian Vance) argue over whether a certain portrait on a nearby wall is Shelley Winters or Judy Holliday. Lucy urges Ethel to ask a lady occupying the next booth, who turns and replies, "Neither. That's Eve Arden." As Ethel realizes she just spoke to Arden herself, Arden passes Lucy and Ethel's table to leave the restaurant while the pair gawk.

Desilu Productions, jointly owned by Desi Arnaz and Ball during their marriage, was the production company for the Our Miss Brooks television show, filmed during the same years as I Love Lucy. Ball and Arden met when they costarred in the film Stage Door in 1937. Ball, according to numerous radio historians, suggested Arden for Our Miss Brooks after Shirley Booth auditioned for but failed to land the role and Ball—committed at the time to My Favorite Husband—could not.

Arden tried another series for CBS in the fall of 1957, The Eve Arden Show, but it was canceled in spring of 1958 after 26 episodes. In 1966, she played Nurse Kelton in an episode of Bewitched. She later costarred with Kaye Ballard as her neighbor and in-law, Eve Hubbard, in the 1967–1969 NBC situation comedy The Mothers-in-Law, produced by Arnaz after the dissolution of Desilu Productions. In her later career, Arden made appearances on such television shows as Bewitched, Alice, Maude, Hart to Hart, and Falcon Crest. In 1985, she appeared as the wicked stepmother in the Faerie Tale Theatre production of Cinderella.

Stage
Arden was one of many actresses to take on the title roles in Hello, Dolly! and Auntie Mame in the 1960s; in 1967, she won the Sarah Siddons Award for her work in Chicago theater. In 1983, Arden was cast as the leading lady in what was to be her Broadway comeback, Moose Murders, but she withdrew and was replaced with the much younger Holland Taylor after one preview performance, citing "artistic differences". The show went on to open and close on the same night, becoming known a legendary flop in Broadway history.

Personal life
Arden was married to Edward Grinnell "Ned" Bergen 1939–47; she reportedly had a long relationship with Danny Kaye through the 1940s (likely starting from their Broadway work on Let's Face It! (1941)). Arden was married to actor Brooks West from 1952 until his death in 1984 from a brain hemorrhage at age 67. She adopted her first child with Bergen and a second child
as a single mother after her divorce from him; she adopted her third child with West and gave birth to her youngest (with West) at age 46 in 1954. All four children survived their parents.

Death
On November 12, 1990, Arden died at home at age 82. According to her death certificate, she died due to cardiac arrest and arteriosclerotic heart disease. She was cremated, with her ashes buried in the Westwood Village Memorial Park Cemetery, Westwood, Los Angeles, California.

Legacy
Arden published an autobiography, The Three Phases of Eve, in 1985. In addition to her Academy Award nomination, Arden has two stars on the Hollywood Walk of Fame: Radio and Television (see List of stars on the Hollywood Walk of Fame for addresses). She was inducted into the National Radio Hall of Fame in 1995.

Filmography

Film

Television

Select stage credits

Private Lives (1933)
On Approval (1933)
Ziegfeld Follies of 1934 (1934)
Ziegfeld Follies of 1936 (1936)
Very Warm for May (1939)
Two for the Show (1940)
Let's Face It! (1941)
Over 21 (1950)
Auntie Mame (1958)
Goodbye Charlie (1960)
The Marriage-Go-Round (1961)
Hello, Dolly! (1966)
Barefoot in the Park (1967)
Cactus Flower (1968)
Butterflies Are Free (1970)
Absurd Person Singular (1978)
Little Me (1980)

References

Sources

Further reading

External links

 Official Website
 
 
 
 
 Eve Arden at Virtual History
 

1908 births
1990 deaths
20th-century American comedians
20th-century American actresses
Actresses from California
Comedians from California
American film actresses
Actresses from the Golden Age of Hollywood
American radio actresses
American stage actresses
American television actresses
American women comedians
American people of German descent
Burials at Westwood Village Memorial Park Cemetery
Outstanding Performance by a Lead Actress in a Comedy Series Primetime Emmy Award winners
People from Mill Valley, California
Tamalpais High School alumni
Vaudeville performers
RKO Pictures contract players
Warner Bros. contract players
Ziegfeld girls